Voltage is an unincorporated community in Harney County, Oregon, United States.

Voltage post office was established in 1908 by Walter C. Botsford, the first postmaster, who was interested in electricity and thought that the river could generate enough "voltage" to serve the entire Harney Basin. He had confused voltage with power; a hydropower project was never attempted. The post office closed in 1933. At one time, Voltage had a store and school district; today, however, there is little evidence of a once-thriving community.

Sodhouse
It was originally the site of a sod house built by a group of local settlers around 1872. The site lent its name to the Sod House Camp of the Civilian Conservation Corps (CCC) and the Sod House Ranch. As of 1978, nothing remained of the sod house but a low rock wall; in 1937 the CCC erected a historic marker at the site. A post office named "Springer" was established near the site of the sod house at Sod House Spring; it was later moved to Narrows and renamed. The Voltage and Narrows school districts were consolidated with the Sod House district in the early 1940s.

Climate
According to the Köppen Climate Classification system, Voltage has a semi-arid climate, abbreviated "BSk" on climate maps.

References

Civilian Conservation Corps in Oregon
Ghost towns in Oregon
Unincorporated communities in Harney County, Oregon
1908 establishments in Oregon
Populated places established in 1908
Unincorporated communities in Oregon